Astor may refer to:

People
 Astor (surname)
 Astor family, a wealthy 18th-century American family who became prominent in 20th-century British politics
 Astor Bennett, a character in the Showtime television series Dexter
 Ástor Piazzolla, a tango musician

Places
 Astore (disambiguation), also spelt Astor, several places in northern Pakistan
 Astor, Florida, United States
 Astor, Kansas, United States
 Astor, West Virginia, United States
 The Astor Theatre, a picture theatre located in St Kilda, Victoria, Australia

Buildings and locations
 Astor Court, located in The Metropolitan Museum of Art in New York City, is a re-creation of a Ming Dynasty-style, Chinese-garden courtyard.
 Astor Court Building, an apartment building on the Upper West Side of Manhattan, built in 1916.
 Astor Place (Manhattan), a place leading to Broadway in New York City
 Astor Row, the name given to 130th Street between Fifth Avenue and Lenox in Harlem

Other uses
 Astor Pictures, a New York-based motion picture releasing company
 Astor Radio Corporation, an Australian consumer electronics manufacturer from 1926 onwards, which also owned the Astor Records label
 Astor Records, an Australian recording company and recorded music distributor that operated from the 1960s to the early 1980s
 Astor Trust Company, a New York-based financial trust that merged with Bankers Trust in 1917.
 Astor National Bank, a New York-based bank that became the Astor Trust Company in 1907.
 , a cruise ship that sailed under the name in 1981–1985 for Hadag Cruise Line and Safmarine
 , a cruise ship that sailed under the name in 1986–1987 for Marlan Corporation and 1995 onwards for Transocean Tours
 , a Panamanian cargo ship in service 1955–70
 ASTOR (disambiguation), a military acronym
 Astor Care and Nursing Agency, Based in Woking England providing home care across surrey
 MG Astor, a sport utility vehicle sold in India
 Astor (Food Brand), a popular Roll Wafer in Indonesia, Saudi Arabia

See also 
 
 
 Astore (disambiguation)
 Astoria (disambiguation)
 Aster (disambiguation)